Lǔ may refer to:
 Shandong, province of China
 Lǔ, a Chinese method of red cooking of meat

See also 
 Lu (disambiguation)